Jeremy Stewart (born February 17, 1989) is a former American football running back. He signed with the Philadelphia Eagles as an undrafted free agent. He played college football at Stanford.

He was also a member of the New York Jets and Oakland Raiders.

Early years
He attended to Catholic High School in Baton Rouge, Louisiana. He was a first-team all-state, all-district and all-metro in his senior year.

College career
He played college football at Stanford. He finished college with 920 rushing yards, 14 rushing touchdowns, 18 receptions, 123 receiving yards, one receiving touchdown and 622 kick return yards.

In his freshman year, he had 343 rushing yards, 2 rushing touchdowns, 7 receptions, 14 receiving yards.

In his sophomore year, he had 76 rushing yards,  one reception for 8 yards for the season.

In his junior year, he had 107 rushing yards, one rushing touchdown, 3 receptions and 22 receiving yards.

Professional career

Philadelphia Eagles
On April 29, 2012, he signed with the Philadelphia Eagles as an undrafted free agent.

New York Jets
On August 8, 2012, he was claimed off waivers by the New York Jets. On August 27, 2012, he was released.

Oakland Raiders
On September 2, 2012, he was signed to the practice squad of the Oakland Raiders.  On November 10, 2012, Stewart was signed from the practice squad to the active roster. On August 30, 2014, he was released.

Denver Broncos
On October 8, 2014, he was signed to the Broncos' practice squad. On November 22, 2014, he was promoted to the active roster.

Hamilton Tiger-Cats
On April 17, 2017, Stewart signed with the Hamilton Tiger-Cats.

References

http://vcomgroup.com/news/jeremy-stewart-looks-to-succeed-in-the-business-world-with-wharton-school-mba-as-he-did-in-the-nfl

External links
Oakland Raiders bio
New York Jets bio
Philadelphia Eagles bio
Stanford Cardinal bio

1989 births
Living people
American football running backs
Stanford Cardinal football players
Philadelphia Eagles players
New York Jets players
Oakland Raiders players
Denver Broncos players
Hamilton Tiger-Cats players
Catholic High School (Baton Rouge, Louisiana) alumni